Homer D. Smith Jr. (February 16, 1922March 6, 2011) was a United States Army major general.

Early life and education
Smith attended Texas A&M University, graduating in 1943.

Career

World War II
Smith enlisted in the U.S. Army upon graduation and was deployed to England, where he worked on the logistics planning for the Normandy landings.

Korean War
7th Infantry Division.

Vietnam War
On 15 October 1969, Smith, then a colonel, became commanding officer Danang Support Command, South Vietnam.

In August 1974 Smith was appointed as head of the Defense Attaché Office, Saigon (DAO), making him the highest-ranking U.S. military official in South Vietnam. In this role Smith was a key figure in the last year of South Vietnam's existence, finally overseeing Operation Frequent Wind, the evacuation of American civilians and "at-risk" Vietnamese from Saigon in April 1975. Smith left Saigon on 29 April 1975 and later resumed command of the DAO residual office at Fort Shafter, Hawaii.

1975 to 1979
Smith's assignments during this period included the following:
Deputy chief of staff for logistics of the United States Army Training and Doctrine Command, Fort Monroe, Hampton, Virginia (1975–77)
Commander, U.S. Army Logistics Center, Fort Lee, Virginia (June 1977-July 1979)

Smith retired from active service in July 1979. Following his retirement he became head of the newly established Logistics Directorate at NATO Headquarters in Haren, Belgium.

Personal life
Smith died on March 6, 2011, in San Antonio, Texas, and was buried at Fort Sam Houston National Cemetery.

References

External sources

1922 births
2011 deaths
United States Army generals
Recipients of the Distinguished Service Medal (US Army)
Recipients of the Legion of Merit
United States Army personnel of World War II
Texas A&M University alumni
American expatriates in the United Kingdom
American expatriates in Belgium